Charles L. Blockson (born December 16, 1933) is an American historian, author, bibliophile, and collector of books, historical documents, art, and other materials related to the history and culture of African Americans, continental Africans, and the African diaspora throughout the rest of the world. He curated two university collections related to the study of African-American history and culture: the Charles L. Blockson Collection of African-Americana and the African Diaspora at Pennsylvania State University and the Charles L. Blockson Afro-American Collection at Temple University.

Early life and education 
Born on December 16, 1933, in Norristown, Pennsylvania, Charles Leroy Blockson is the oldest of eight children born to Charles and Annie Blockson. During a history lesson his fourth grade teacher, a white woman, asserted that "Negroes have no history. They were born to serve white people." Blockson went home and told his parents, who assured him that black people do have a history and taught him about prominent African-American men and women. That statement launched Blockson's lifelong journey to unearth, collect, and preserve the history, culture and contributions of African descendants. Book collecting excursions led Blockson to the Salvation Army, antique shops, church bazaars, and Philadelphia, where he discovered many book stores. Blockson became well-known among book and artifact dealers, and his passion for collecting ultimately has taken him around the world, inspired him to write books, and made him one of the foremost experts on the Underground Railroad.

Educated in Norristown Area School District, Blockson excelled in athletics, including football and track and field. A star athlete at the Norristown High School and Penn State University, he won state and national honors, and participated in the Penn Relays. While in high school and college, he would go to bookstores when traveling to participate in sports events.

Blockson is a 1956 graduate of Pennsylvania State University and has three honorary doctorate degrees from Lincoln University, Holy Family University, and Villanova University.

Career
Blockson is a co-founder of the African American Museum in Philadelphia; founding member of the Pennsylvania Black History Committee of the Pennsylvania Historical & Museum Commission; past president of the Pennsylvania Abolition Society; former chairman of the National Park Service Underground Railroad Advisory Committee; and former director of the Philadelphia African American Pennsylvania State Marker Project (the largest African-American marker program in the United States).

Among his proudest moments was the commemoration of the Pennsylvania Slave Trade marker at Penn's Landing near the Independence Seaport Museum, unveiled in 2016.

Blockson retired from Temple University in 2006 and serves as Curator Emeritus of the Afro-American Collection.

The Charles L. Blockson Afro-American Collection 
In 1984, Blockson donated his collection of cultural artifacts from African-American history to Temple University. The Charles L. Blockson Afro-American Collection, has since expanded further and now contains more than 500,000 books, documents, and photographs.

He has contributed items to the Charles L. Blockson Collection of African-Americana and the African Diaspora at the Pennsylvania State University and the National Museum of African American History and Culture (NAAMHC). He made a donation to the NAAMHC, which included 39 items owned by Harriet Tubman that were bequeathed to him by her grand-niece.

Honors
In 2017, Charles L. Blockson was the 96th recipient of the Philadelphia Award.

External links 
 Charles L. Blockson Afro-American Collection

References

1933 births
Living people
Pennsylvania State University alumni
People from Norristown, Pennsylvania
American bibliographers
African-American historians
American bibliophiles
American book and manuscript collectors
21st-century African-American people
20th-century African-American people